Second Chance is a rock opera conceived by Stéphane Prémont and Frédérick Desroches about high schoolers' not-so-easy lives. The central character, Johnny, sees his life turn sour because of rumors, betrayal and bad communication. The story deals with suicide, anorexia, drugs and teen pregnancy. It is based on his first play entitled Holding Out for Hero, presented in 1994. He started composing the musical version of the show in 2008, and the finished product was ready later that year, in August. The original run started on March 15, 2009. A French production opened in February 2010 at the Quebec City Salle Dina-Belanger. It was the first professional production of the show.

Stéphane Prémont recently received the "Personnel Engagé" Prize at the "Forces Avenir" gala presented June 14, 2008 at the Capitole's Cabaret in Quebec City.

Productions
The original run of the musical played at the 400-seats Externat Saint-Jean-Eudes' Auditorium under the name Second Chance. The show was performed nine times between March 15, 2009 and March 21, 2009. Stephane Prémont and Émilie Desgagnés directed the production, François Ouellet designed the lighting and Jean-François "Frisco" Roy was the sound engineer. Roxanne Rondeau, Justine Bilodeau, Sarah Morin and Valerie Goulet-Marceau were the choreographers, and Genevieve Brousseau was the vocal arranger.

A new production opened in February 2010 in Quebec City. There were several major changes in the plot, including the translation of the show into French by Alexandre Martel and the show's name changed to Au Pied du Mur. It was a two-week run at the Salle Dina-Bélanger. Jean-Pierre Cloutier, "Conservatoire d'art dramatique de Québec" alumni, directed the new production.

Synopsis

Musical numbers

Act I
"Prologue" - Company
"Ouverture" - Johnny, Jennylee, Company
"Sacrés Coeurs" - Jennylee, Ethan, Company, Johnny
"Un tango nommé désir" - Ana, Shawn
"My destiny" - Johnny, Randy, Patrick, Melissande
"Me verra-t-il un jour?" - Melissande, Mary Jane
"It's not that easy" - Johnny, Jennylee, Mr. O'Hara
"Broken glass" - Johnny 
"Sunnier Days" - Heather, Mary Jane
"Out of his shadow" - Randy, Melissande, Company
"You’ve been kissed a lot" - Randy, Ana, Mary Jane, Ed, Patrick, Ethan, Jennylee
"Light at the end of the tunnel" - Randy, Jennylee, Company 
"Time to grow up" - Ana, Randy

Act II 
"Read all about it/Johnny's down" - Randy, Patrick, Ed, Ethan, Jennylee, Company
"No more" - Ed, Ana
"Something new" - Ethan, Jennylee, Mr.Webson
"Broken glass (reprise)" - Johnny, Patrick
"No one ever has it easy" - Heather, Ed
"Don't you know" - Randy, Ana
"Don't you know" (reprise) - Randy, Ana
"A way out?" - Melissande, Johnny
"Pick up" - Johnny, Jennylee, Randy, Patrick, Ana
"Second Chance" - Ana, Randy, Patrick, Company
"Sunnier days (reprise)" - Jennylee, Company
"Pick up (reprise)" - Randy, Patrick, Ana, Jennylee, Johnny
"United we stand (reprise)" - Johnny, Heather, Randy, Ana, Company

Roles description and original cast members

2010 French Cast Understudies : Yannick Vézina (Patrick u/s),
2009 Original Quebec City Cast Ensemble and understudies : Genevieve Brousseau (Ana u/s), Stéphane Prémont (Mr. O'Hara u/s), Alexandre Martel(Ed u/s), Justine Bilodeau, Sarah Morin, Valérie Goulet-Marceau, Roxanne Rondeau
Previous roles that were cut during the productions process :

On-stage band

Official website
Au Pied du Mur

References

Canadian musicals
Rock operas
2008 musicals